Presidential elections were held in Mongolia on 24 May 2009. They were contested between incumbent Nambaryn Enkhbayar, supported by the Mongolian People's Revolutionary Party, and Tsakhiagiin Elbegdorj, who had support of the Democratic Party and the opposition parties. Elbegdorj declared himself the victor before the count was official but based on his party's counts. Enkhbayar admitted a narrow defeat shortly after and said that he would respect the results, marking the second time an incumbent president had lost their bid for re-election - following Punsalmaagiin Ochirbat in the 1997 election.

Background
There had been fears that a close result could lead to civil unrest as happened in the 2008 legislative election, where allegations of vote rigging had sparked street protests and clashes with the police during which five people lost their lives and hundreds were injured. Although, police and army units were on stand-by to contain any protest, the people seemed satisfied with the report of the election monitors in that there was no finding of fraudulent votes.

Candidates
Presidential candidates were only allowed from parties which had representation in the State Great Khural.  The eligible parties were the Mongolian People's Revolutionary Party (MPRP), Democratic Party, Civic Will Party and Mongolian Green Party.  The MPRP fielded the incumbent president Nambaryn Enkhbayar as its presidential candidate.  The Democratic Party chose former prime minister Tsakhiagiin Elbegdorj as their candidate.  The Civic Will and Green parties did not field a candidate and instead chose to support Tsakhiagiin Elbegdorj, the Democratic Party's candidate, thus providing the electorate with a choice between the incumbent or a candidate supported by all of the opposition parties.

Elbegdorj, who served twice as prime minister, campaigned on a theme of anti-corruption and a need for change which proved popular in urban areas.  Both candidates' campaigns were dominated by the issue of how Mongolia's mineral wealth should be distributed.

Results

The United States Senate passed Resolution number 192 supporting Mongolia's democracy and economic development and noting Elbegdorj's election victory on the day he was sworn in on 18 June 2009.

References

Mongolia
Presidential elections in Mongolia
2009 presidential